The Dark Side of Love is a 1984 Italian erotic romantic drama film written and directed by  Salvatore Samperi. The film, which has a scabrous main theme as an incest between a sister and a porn-obsessed brother, was a box office success.

Cast 
Monica Guerritore as Patrizia
Lorenzo Lena as  Emilio
Gianfranco Manfredi as  Franco Alessi 
Saverio Vallone as  Arrigo

References

External links

1984 films
Italian erotic drama films
Films directed by Salvatore Samperi
Incest in film
1984 drama films
Films about siblings
1980s erotic drama films
Erotic romance films
1980s Italian-language films
1980s Italian films